Stoev (masculine) or Stoeva (feminine) is a Bulgarian surname. Notable people with the surname include:

Andrey Stoev (born 1986), Bulgarian footballer
Boris Stoev (born 1926), Bulgarian cross country skier
Dzhina Stoeva (born 1976), Bulgarian singer
Emil Stoev (born 1986), Bulgarian footballer
Gabriela Stoeva (born 1994), Bulgarian badminton player
Georgi Stoev (1973–2008), Bulgarian writer
Lachezara Stoeva (born 1977), Bulgarian diplomat
Martin Stoev (born 1971), Bulgarian volleyball player and coach
Mladen Stoev (born 1984), Bulgarian footballer
Stefani Stoeva (born 1995), Bulgarian badminton player
Stoycho Stoev (born 1962), Bulgarian footballer
Todor Stoev (born 1988), Bulgarian footballer
Valcho Stoev (born 1952), Bulgarian shot putter
Vasilka Stoeva (born 1940), Bulgarian discus thrower

Bulgarian-language surnames